Arnoro was a charter airline based in Sarajevo, Bosnia and Herzegovina. It was established in 2004 and started operations in November 2004. It operated services to Scandinavia and Turkey. Its main base was Sarajevo International Airport.

From start Arnoro had many technical problems. Flights to Scandinavia were soon forbidden because there were not installed security door between cockpit and passenger cabin on their MD-81. Flights were canceled and no money was given back to any of passengers. After three months flights started again, but did not last very long. Sarajevo airport did not allowed Arnoro to fly anymore because of their bill. Arnoro continued flights form Mostar's airport.

Arnoro moved to charter flights and went to Albania, Spain and Africa. In Gabon Arnoro MD-81 landed to pick passengers but as Gabon's government says they have no rights to enter their country and crew on plane was left with no supplement of food for three days. Bosnian and French government made deal to return crew to Sarajevo but for Gabon to keep the plane. Arnoro canceled all his operations and simply gone missing.

Previous Destinations 

 Banja Luka (Banja Luka International Airport)
 Mostar (Mostar International Airport)
 Sarajevo (Sarajevo International Airport) Hub

 Oslo (Oslo Airport, Gardermoen)

 Stockholm (Stockholm-Arlanda Airport)
 Gothenburg (Göteborg Landvetter Airport)

 Copenhagen (Copenhagen Airport)

 Istanbul (Atatürk International Airport)

 London (London Heathrow Airport)

Fleet 
 1 McDonnell Douglas MD-81 (leased from US Airways from 2004 to 2005)

References

Defunct airlines of Bosnia and Herzegovina
Airlines established in 2004
Airlines disestablished in 2006
2004 establishments in Bosnia and Herzegovina